Shotor Khvar and Shotor Khar or Shuturkhwar may refer to:

Shotor Khvar, Pishva
Shotor Khvar, Robat Karim